Martin Jago (born 4 August 1972) is a British theatre director and author. 
His first book, To Play or Not to Play: 50 Games for Acting Shakespeare, with a foreword by British actor Alfred Molina, was published in the U.S. in 2012 by Smith & Kraus. His second book, ESL Shakespeare: 101 Everyday Phrases, also published by Smith & Kraus, was released in 2013.

In 2018, Jago published two more theatre books with Smith & Kraus, From Courts to Dungeons, and The Actor's Complete Shakespeare Sonnet Bible.

As a poet, his work has been published in literary magazines and journals such as Agenda,  LIT Magazine,  The Moth,  and Acumen.   

Educated at The University of Oxford, Jago first trained as an actor at The Royal Welsh College of Music and Drama before a change of career in 2004 to focus on directing and writing for theatre and in 2014 he founded the Los Angeles-based theatre company, Raze the Space, which produces an annual festival of ten-minute plays and theatre awards at The Samuel French Bookstore in Hollywood.

References

External links

1972 births
Living people